Sunburst is a graphic design term for the pattern seen in fanlights and other architectural elements.

Sunburst may also refer to:

Arts and entertainment
 Sunburst (album), a 1975 album by American jazz trumpeter Eddie Henderson
 Sunburst (Loudness album), a 2021 album by Japanese heavy metal band Loudness
 Sunburst (band), an African rock band formed in 1970
 Sunburst (EP), a 1990 EP by Chapterhouse
 Sunburst (film), a 1975 American film directed by James Polakof
 Sunburst (Magic: The Gathering), an ability used in the Magic: The Gathering card game
 Sunburst Award, a Canadian science fiction award
 Sunburst, a novel by Phyllis Gotlieb
 Sunburst, a character in My Little Pony: Friendship Is Magic

Other uses
 Sunburst (community), in California, US
 Sunburst (dinghy), a dinghy sailing boat
 Sunburst (finish), a type of finish for musical instruments
 Sunburst (symbol), a rayed solar symbol or rayed halo
 the Argead Star in classical Greek iconography
 Sunburst flag, an Irish Republican flag
 Sunburst, Montana, a town in the United States
 Sunburst chart
 Airmass Sunburst, ultralight aircraft
 Sunburst, the nickname of the 40th Infantry Division (United States)
 Sunburst, a common name for plants in the genus Pseudobahia
 SUNBURST, a name given to a malware payload implicated in the 2020 United States federal government data breach

See also
 Sunburst Records (disambiguation)